Suzanne Blumel, known as Suzanne Blum (24 November 1898 in Niort, France – 23 January 1994) was a French lawyer and writer under the pseudonym L.-S. Karen with three crime novels.

Early life
Suzanne Marguerite Blumel was born at Niort in western France, daughter of merchant Joseph Blumel and Amélie, née Cahen. The family were from Alsace.

Career
As a lawyer, she joined the bar in 1922 and worked on several famous cases, notably representing Warner Brothers against Igor Stravinsky in a copyright case, and Rita Hayworth during her divorce from Prince Aly Khan. Upon the death of the Duke of Windsor, she looked after the assets of Wallis, Duchess of Windsor, and gradually became her single representative, until her death in 1986; Blum's presence and actions during these years are a subject of controversy.

Personal life
In 1934, she married Paul Weill, the Duke of Windsor's attorney in Paris. He died in 1965, and she subsequently remarried, to General Georges Spillmann (died 1980).

References

1898 births
1994 deaths
20th-century French women lawyers
People from Niort
20th-century French lawyers
20th-century French novelists
20th-century French women writers
French crime fiction writers